Oh Mong-nyeo (오몽녀) is a 1937 Korean film, the last film directed by Na Woon-gyu. It premiered at the DanSungSa theater in downtown Seoul.

Plot summary
This literary adaptation tells the story of Oh Mong-nyeo, a young woman living with her adopted father in a seaside village. When men in the village attempt to rape her, she escapes by boat with her boyfriend to seek a better life elsewhere.

See also
Korea under Japanese rule
List of Korean-language films
Cinema of Korea

References

External links 
 Images from Oh Mong-nyeo at The Korean Film Archive (KOFA)
Oh Mong-nyeo at the Internet Movie Database

1937 films
Pre-1948 Korean films
Korean black-and-white films
Films directed by Na Woon-gyu